Joseph 'JJ' Johnson (born August 1, 1984) is a chef and author best known for cooking the food of the African Diaspora. He is a Chef on Buzzfeed's Tasty platform and a television host on Just Eats with Chef JJ.

Johnson is the founder of Ingrained Hospitality Concepts LLC, a collaboration of industry professionals. The group opened the restaurant chain Fieldtrip. The quick-casual rice bowl shop in Harlem highlights rice traditions from around the world with globally-inspired flavors and techniques.

Johnson's signature style was inspired by the Caribbean tastes he grew up with, inspiration from his travels and his signature R+B and hip-hop playlist. Chef JJ published his first cookbook in 2018, Between Harlem and Heaven, co-authored with Alexander Smalls. He serves on the James Beard Impact Programs Advisory Committee and sits on the junior board of Food Bank for New York City, taking action to end hunger. He has won a James Beard Foundation Book Award.

Early life and education
Johnson was born in 1984 in Long Island, New York, but spent his youth in the Poconos. At the age of eight, Johnson was inspired to become a chef.

After seeing a commercial for the Culinary Institute of America, Johnson told his mother that he wanted to become a chef. After watching his Puerto Rican grandmother serve butternut squash soup and other ethnic dishes, he knew he had to.

Career
After graduating from the Culinary Institute of America, Johnson spent time in Ghana studying West African cuisine, before returning to cook at several New York City restaurants, including Tropico, Jane, Tribeca Grill, and Centro Vinoteca.

In 2011, Johnson (26) competed and won Bravo's Rocco's Dinner Party cooking competition, quickly catching the eye of restaurateur Alexander Smalls. Smalls invited Johnson to breakfast to introduce the concept of Afro-Asian cooking to him. A year later, Johnson joined Smalls on an extended trip to Ghana, where they prepared a series of American-themed dinners.

Upon their return, Smalls and Johnson developed 36 different menus that would ultimately be narrowed down to one Afro-Asian inspired menu for The Cecil in 2013.

Since its opening, the restaurant has garnered several awards including "Best New Restaurant in America (Esquire).

Johnson himself was ranked among Forbes’ 30 Under 30 in the Food & Wine category (2014), Zagat's 30 Under 30 (2014) and Eater's Young Guns (2014).

Johnson and Smalls also co-authored the Afro-Asian inspired cookbook, Between Harlem and Heaven.

In 2018, Johnson became the chef at The Henry at Life Hotel in Manhattan, with a menu that focuses on African diaspora cuisine.

In 2019, Chef JJ and Ingrained Hospitality opened FIELDTRIP, a quick casual rice bowl shop in Harlem. FieldTrip is a celebration of rice and culture showcasing global flavors through bowls of freshly milled, unbleached, and un-enriched rices. They are the “granddaddy” heirloom grains of rices we commonly know today and each has its own history. FieldTrip's mantra, Rice is Culture, was born out of a realization that rice can be found at the center of tables of so many cultures around the world. Rice connects people. The cuisine is influenced by global flavors from Asia to Africa to America and the Caribbean.

References

1984 births
Living people
American chefs
American male chefs
People from Long Island
Culinary Institute of America alumni